"Stay (Wasting Time)" is a song by Dave Matthews Band, released as the second single off their album Before These Crowded Streets. As a single, it reached #8 on the Modern Rock Tracks chart, #33 on Top 40 Mainstream, and #20 on the Adult 40. The song features The Lovely Ladies (Tawatha Agee, Cindy Myzell, and Brenda White King) on background vocals.

The song was used by the Virginia Tourism Corporation for a 2005 television commercial. It was also featured in the 2007 film The Kingdom.

Track listing
"Stay (Wasting Time)" (Remix Edit) — 4:34
"Stay (Wasting Time)" (Album Edit) — 4:34
"Stay (Wasting Time)" (Album Version) — 5:36

Australian Version
"Stay (Wasting Time)" (Edit) - 2:55
"Stay (Wasting Time)" (Album Edit) - 4:30
"Lover Lay Down" - 6:22

Live releases
A live performance of "Stay (Wasting Time)" is featured on the following albums:
Listener Supported
Live in Chicago 12.19.98
Live at Folsom Field, Boulder, Colorado
The Central Park Concert
Live Trax Vol. 1
Live Trax Vol. 2
Live Trax Vol. 6
The Best of What's Around Vol. 1
Live Trax Vol. 9
Live Trax Vol. 10
Live at Piedmont Park
Live at Mile High Music Festival

Charts

References

1998 singles
Dave Matthews Band songs
Songs written by Dave Matthews
Song recordings produced by Steve Lillywhite
1998 songs
RCA Records singles
Songs written by Stefan Lessard
Songs written by LeRoi Moore